Martin Kreuzriegler (born 10 January 1994) is an Austrian professional footballer who plays as a centre-back for Widzew Łódź.

Career

FC Blau-Weiß Linz
After one season in Malta with Hibernians, Kreuzriegler returned to FC Blau-Weiß Linz in June 2018 on a two-year deal.

References

External links
 
 

1994 births
Living people
Austrian footballers
SC Austria Lustenau players
FC Blau-Weiß Linz players
Floridsdorfer AC players
SV Horn players
Hibernians F.C. players
Sandefjord Fotball players
Widzew Łódź players
2. Liga (Austria) players
Austrian Regionalliga players
Maltese Premier League players
Eliteserien players
I liga players
Ekstraklasa players
Association football defenders
Expatriate footballers in Malta
Austrian expatriate sportspeople in Malta
Expatriate footballers in Norway
Austrian expatriate sportspeople in Norway
Expatriate footballers in Poland
Austrian expatriate sportspeople in Poland
Austria youth international footballers